Seminole Heights is a historic neighborhood and district located in central Tampa. It includes many early 20th century bungalow homes and historic buildings. It was an early residential area of Tampa connected by streetcar. The area had an economic downturn in the late 20th century marked by increased crime, but has since seen a resurgence with new restaurants, brew pubs and independent businesses opening up. The neighborhood's historic homes, eclectic shops and gourmet restaurants are an increasing draw.

As of the 2000 census, the district had a population of 24,567.

Description

Seminole Heights is known for its historic craftsman style bungalows from the early 20th century. Many buildings in the neighborhood existed in the early 1900s, including the Seminole Heights Methodist Church, Seminole Heights Elementary School, Broward Elementary, Hillsborough High School, and St. Paul Lutheran Church. The Seminole Heights Garden Center, a neighborhood park, is used for community events such as art festivals and picnics. Seminole Heights has the longest stretch of Riverfront parkland in the city of Tampa.  Rivercrest, Epps, and several pocket parks provide access to the Hillsborough River.

In recent years Seminole Heights has experienced rising property values and a decrease in crime.  The area is popular among young professionals and their families who are seeking an alternative to master planned communities.  The area contains two designated historical districts including Seminole Heights (local and national designation) and Hampton Terrace (national designation).

In 2003, Southeast Seminole Heights was named Best Neighborhood in America by Neighborhoods, USA (NUSA).

In July 2009, This Old House magazine ranked Seminole Heights among the best places to buy an old house for: families, green thumbs, cottages and bungalows, single women homebuyers, porch sitters, walkers, and the south. Overall, Seminole Heights was in the top eight of editors picks.

The district has become known as a dining destination. Notable restaurant/ bars include Rooster and the Til, Ichicoro, the Independent Bar & Cafe', and  Ella's Americana Folk Art Cafe.

In 2014, Seminole Heights made international headlines  when a "local naturalist" sent a picture of a two headed alligator to a local newspaper, which ran the image as its cover story. The alligator was allegedly captured by local trappers and taxidermied for display at Ella's Folkart Cafe. The authenticity of the creature has often come under question. Since the story in 2014, it has been the subject of art murals, flags, tee-shirts and other ephemera related to the neighborhood.

In 2016, the creature made news again when the community art project, Urban Art Attack, funded the building of a two headed alligator statue on Nebraska Ave.

History

Seminole Heights was born in 1911.  T. Roy Young had  to develop Tampa's first suburb three miles (5 km) north of downtown.  He called it Seminole Heights.

Ten years earlier Tampa's population had reached 26,000. A trolley line connected Sulphur Springs to downtown, making travel to the suburbs possible and inviting. The streetcar made it possible to live in one area of town and work in another.

Young recognized this potential. His Seminole Development Corporation property encompassed a rectangle bordered by Hillsborough Avenue, Central Avenue, Wilder Avenue and Florida Avenue. The houses built here were mostly bungalow, oriented east-to-west and started at $5,000.

Other developments quickly followed. By 1912, the Mutual Development Company owned by Milton and Giddings Mabry and the Dekle Investment Company owned by Lee and James Dekle surveyed and platted land adjacent to Seminole Heights forming the Suwanee Heights subdivision. Bounded by Henry Avenue, Hillsborough Avenue, Central Avenue and Florida Avenue, Suwanee Heights was also a restricted subdivision. Like the original Seminole Heights, houses required the same east–west orientation but started at $1,400.

During the "Florida Bloom" years (roughly 1919–1929), more development came to areas north and east of the original subdivisions. Of course, with this development came the merchants seeing an opportunity to provide welcome goods and services to the residents. Some of those early businesses have faded away. However, many current Seminole Heights businesses have been open for more than 50 years.

In 2017 the area had the Seminole Heights serial killer.

Now in 2021, The neighborhood has been redeveloping and homes are being updated leading to quite a popular area for those seeking to find historic properties. This neighborhood is filled with shops, restaurants and bars and is up and coming.

Areas

The greater Seminole Heights area has a resident population 23,141 living in 9,433 households as of 2009. The median household income is $47,817. The median age is 37. The area is projected to grow 5.89% during 2009–2014. 47% of the population has some college level education or higher. Seventy percent 70% of the homes are owner occupied. (Source:SiteReports.com)

Seminole Heights consists of three distinct neighborhoods:
 Old Seminole Heights  (pop. 15,062)
 South Seminole Heights  (pop. 3,160)
 Southeast Seminole Heights (pop. 3,384)

source for population figures: The Planning Commission

Education
Schools within Seminole Heights include:
 Cleveland Elementary
 Hillsborough High School - Website
 Broward Elementary
 Edison Elementary
 Seminole Elementary
 Memorial Middle School
Pepin Academies

See also
 Hampton Terrace Historic District
 Seminole Heights Residential District
 Riverside Heights
 Tampa Heights
 West Tampa

References

External links

Neighborhood associations
  South Seminole Heights
 Southeast Seminole Heights
 Old Seminole Heights Neighborhood Association
 Business Guild of Seminole Heights
 North East Seminole Heights

Blogs and information
 Historic Seminole Heights information
 Hampton Terrace Historic District
 Seminole Heights Blog
 Tommy in Seminole Heights Blog
 My Seminole Heights Blog Information and Activities in Seminole Heights

Neighborhoods in Tampa, Florida